Guttahalli is a small village in the Kolar Taluk of Kolar district in Karnataka, India. It is situated about 25 kilometers from Kolar.

Demographics 
According to the 2011 Indian Census, the village consists of 1,090 people. The town has a literacy rate of 55.05 percent which is lower than Karnataka's average of 75.36 percent.

References

Villages in Kolar district